Riebe is a surname. Notable people with the surname include:

Bill Riebe (1917–2000), American basketball player
David Riebe (born 1988), Swedish composer
Ernest Riebe, German-born American cartoonist
Hank Riebe (1921–2001), American baseball player
Kathleen Riebe, American politician
Mel Riebe (1916–1977), American basketball player